Spyne is a fictional character, a mutant appearing in American comic books published by Marvel Comics. The character, unlike many mutants, is more monstrously deformed and reptilian as opposed to other mutants' somewhat-human appearances (Nightcrawler, Tusk, et al.). His first appearance was in Cable #17.

Fictional character biography
Spyne was one of the mutant members of the Dark Riders. A cannibalistic carnivore, Spyne views his adversaries as a meal more than anything else.

Spyne was first seen with the Dark Riders as they hunted down the team's former member Foxbat in Alexandria, Egypt. Later, Spyne was amongst those Dark Riders that hunted Caliban in the Morlock tunnels and clashed with Cable, Storm, and Domino. Spyne was able to disarm Cable, but Cable defeated him with his telekinetic powers.

After clashing with Cable and his allies once more in Egypt, where their leader was revealed to be Cable's son Tyler, calling himself Genesis, Spyne and the Dark Riders captured Faye Livingstone, a woman who once had a romantic history with Mister Sinister. The Dark Riders then captured Jean Grey for Genesis.

After the events with Mister Sinister, Spyne took part in breaking Cyber out of a Scottish dungeon and took them to their rebuilt fortress in Egypt where the villain was stripped of his adamantium in a process that killed him. When the feral X-Man Wolverine infiltrated their fortress, the Dark Riders captured him and attempted to use Cyber's former adamantium skin to bond to Wolverine's bones, recently removed of its original adamantium by Magneto. When fellow X-Man Cannonball interfered with Genesis's plans for Wolverine, Spyne and the others started to beat up on Cannonball. This allowed Wolverine to break free from the bonding process, and both he and Cannonball fled to Apocalypse's resurrection chamber, where the Dark Riders pursued them. In the ensuing battle, Spyne was killed by Wolverine just as he was prepared to attack Cannonball. Wolverine then used Spyne's severed tail to ensnare and kill his fellow Dark Rider Deadbolt.

Spyne, along with several of his fellow Dark Riders, is resurrected by means of the Transmode Virus to serve as part of Selene's army of deceased mutants. Under the control of Selene and Eli Bard, he takes part in the assault on the mutant nation of Utopia.

Later Spyne is part of the new Dark Riders that attempts to kill off all the mutant healers. He and the rest of the team are killed by Magneto's Uncanny X-Men and blow up with the remains of Genosha.

Other versions

Age of Apocalypse
Spyne is a member of the Brotherhood of Chaos.

References

Fictional cannibals
Fictional reptilians
Marvel Comics supervillains
Marvel Comics mutants
Marvel Comics characters who can move at superhuman speeds
Marvel Comics characters with superhuman strength